40 Days and 40 Nights is a 2002 satirical erotic romantic comedy film directed by Michael Lehmann, written by Rob Perez, and starring Josh Hartnett, Shannyn Sossamon and Paulo Costanzo. The film depicts Matt Sullivan, a San Francisco web designer who has chosen to abstain from any sexual contact for the duration of Lent.

Plot 
Matt Sullivan lives in San Francisco with his roommate Ryan, working at a dot-com company. His obsession with his ex-girlfriend Nicole causes him sexual dysfunction with other women, which he confides to his brother John, a Catholic priest-in-training. After disastrously trying to fake an orgasm with a date, Matt learns that Nicole is now engaged. Hoping to resolve his issues, he vows to abstain from sexual stimulation, including masturbation, for the 40 days of Lent.

On the first day of his celibacy, Matt purges his apartment of items of temptation and reminders of Nicole. He befriends a stranger named Erica at a laundromat, despite being unable to speak to her. Unbeknownst to Matt, his coworkers and Ryan start a pool to bet on how long he can last, which soon spreads online. He revisits the laundromat to see Erica, who reveals she works as a “cyber nanny” filtering internet pornography. They share an emotional connection, and Matt takes Erica on a date riding the city bus, but awkwardly avoids kissing her.

They both discover his coworkers’ betting pool, complete with its own website. Matt tries to explain his intentions, but Erica remains upset, and Matt’s boss decides to join him in celibacy. Having fallen for Matt, she agrees to another date, where they run into Nicole and her fiancé. Frustrated by Matt’s vow and his feelings for Nicole, Erica leaves him. Struggling with his urges, Matt is forced to endure his coworkers’ attempts to sabotage him. He turns to his brother for help, but even a family dinner results in their parents discussing their own sex life.

By Day 35 of Matt’s vow, the pool has reached $18,000, and a colleague convinces him to give in. As Matt marches into the bathroom to masturbate, he discovers his boss – who accidentally had a Viagra-spiked drink intended for Matt – masturbating in the next stall. With the entire office waiting, Matt escapes through the bathroom window and goes to Erica. They reconcile and spend a night of intimacy together without actual intercourse.

On Day 38, Matt has an inadvertent erection at work and is sent home. Nicole arrives at his apartment, having broken up with her cheating fiancé, but Matt rejects her advances and sends her away, which only excites her more. Overhearing the bet the next day, she goes to Matt’s coworkers, adding her own $3,500 to the pot and discovering that Matt has plans to celebrate with Erica at midnight when his vow ends.

On Day 40, the long-suffering Matt is unable to stop picturing women naked. He walks in on his brother kissing a nun; tormented by Matt’s exploits, John is taking a sabbatical from the priesthood. Fighting to contain himself, Matt has Ryan handcuff him to his bed, and awakens from an erotic dream to find Nicole has raped him while he was asleep, just before midnight. Arriving as Nicole is leaving, Erica assumes Matt was unfaithful and dishonored his vow, and storms out.

Determined to win Erica back, Matt gives her a box of moments they had shared; he finds her at the laundromat, and they finally kiss. As they consummate their relationship in Matt’s bedroom for hours, Ryan and the coworkers wait outside and place new bets on how long he can last, until Matt kicks them all out.

Cast 

 Josh Hartnett as Matt Sullivan
 Shannyn Sossamon as Erica Sutton
 Paulo Costanzo as Ryan
 Maggie Gyllenhaal as Sam
 Vinessa Shaw as Nicole
 Adam Trese as John Sullivan
 Griffin Dunne as Jerry Anderson
 Keegan Connor Tracy as Mandy
 Emmanuelle Vaugier as Susie
 Monet Mazur as Candy
 Christine Chatelain as Andie
 Mike Maronna as Bagel Boy
 Stanley Anderson as Father Maher
 Lorin Heath as Diana
 Glenn Fitzgerald as Chris
 Jarrad Paul as Duncan
 Terry Chen as Neil
 Kai Lennox as Nick
 Chris Gauthier as Mikey
 Barry Newman as Walter Sullivan
 Mary Gross as Bev Sullivan
 Dylan Neal as David Brokaw

Production 

Writer Rob Perez said they pitched the film to every studio in town, and eventually got a deal. Perez turned in the first draft a few months later and the film was greenlit. Thirteen months after having sold the pitch, filming began. The film was released a year-and-a-half later. 
In retrospect Perez noted how lucky he was that the film got made: "At the time I believed the film was made because of the script. However, in retrospect I believe it was made because of a confluence of a 20 completely random stars aligning. This included an influx of money at the studio from a new partnership; their recent films had been hits; young comedies like mine were connecting at the time; a few bankable actors in the age range wanted to play the lead; the executive(s) happened to like (or at least think it was commercial) the concept/script; and that the producer was hungry enough that when he hit road blocks, he found other ways to keep moving forward. I can go on, but hope this is enough to illustrate my point: the film was made because of 20 things that had nothing to do with the script."

The film was shot primarily in Vancouver, but also featured some San Francisco locations, including Potrero Hill, San Francisco, California.

Reception

Critical response 
 
On Rotten Tomatoes the film has an approval rating of 39% based on reviews from 137 critics, with an average rating of 4.90/10. The site's consensus states: "As romantic comedies go, 40 Days and 40 Nights is smutty, sexist, and puerile." On Metacritic the film has a score of 53%, based on reviews from 33 critics. Audiences surveyed by CinemaScore gave the film a grade B on scale of A to F.

Roger Ebert of Chicago Sun-Times gave the film 3 out of 4 stars. He praised director Michael Lehmann for raising the film above the level of sexual sitcom, through his sympathy for his characters and use of humor to examine human nature. He also credited writer Rob Perez for dialogue about sex with "more complexity and nuance than we expect". Not wanting to reveal too much, Ebert explained he was dissatisfied with the ending, writing, "Nicole's entire participation is offensive and unnecessary, and that there was a sweeter and funnier way to resolve everything."
Variety's Todd McCarthy called it "A self-described abstinence comedy that is funny, sexy and silly in equal measure" but notes "had tried to deepen the film’s potentially serious themes as often as they make light of them, they might have come up with something more than the disposable farce at hand."

Peter Travers called it "a one-joke sex farce", and complains "Yup, director Michael Lehmann, far from the glory days of "Heathers," has made a movie about a hard-on, in which he relentlessly pounds a flaccid premise."
Lou Lumenick of the New York Post called the film "So eyeball-gougingly awful that you're tempted to give up movies for Lent."

Box office 
The film earned in its opening weekend $12,229,529. It earned $37,939,782 at the domestic box office and $57,152,885 in other territories, for a worldwide total of $95,146,283.

Accolades 
In 2005 Empire magazine included the film on its list of "Worst Sex Scenes".

References

External links
 
 
 
 

2002 films
2002 romantic comedy films
2000s sex comedy films
American romantic comedy films
American sex comedy films
British romantic comedy films
British sex comedy films
2000s English-language films
English-language French films
Films about rape
Films critical of the Catholic Church
Films directed by Michael Lehmann
Films produced by Eric Fellner
Films produced by Tim Bevan
Films scored by Rolfe Kent
Films set in San Francisco
Films shot in San Francisco
French romantic comedy films
French sex comedy films
Miramax films
StudioCanal films
Universal Pictures films
Working Title Films films
2000s American films
2000s British films
2000s French films